Australians Against Further Immigration (AAFI) was an Australian far-right political party which described itself as "eco-nationalist", was opposed to mass immigration and aimed for zero net migration. The party was founded in 1989 and registered in 1990, and ceased to exist in 2008.

AAFI stood candidates at both state and federal level, but never won a seat. The party said it was a mainstream organisation, and sought to distance itself from extremist organisations such as the Australian League of Rights and from the Citizens Electoral Council. In 1994, Franca Arena, then a Labor member of the New South Wales Legislative Council, denounced the party in the New South Wales parliament.

In by-elections in Mackellar and Warringah (safe Liberal seats on the Northern Beaches of Sydney) in 1994, Labor MP Graeme Campbell urged electors to vote for Australians Against Further Immigration (AAFI).

The party was deregistered by the Australian Electoral Commission in December 2005, as lacking the minimum 500 members required to be registered as a political party. It contested the 2007 New South Wales state election, but was also deregistered at the state level not long after.

Federal parliament

See also
Far-right politics in Australia
Kiwis Against Further Immigration

References

Political parties established in 1989
Political parties disestablished in 2008
Anti-immigration politics in Australia
Single-issue political parties
Defunct far right political parties in Australia
1989 establishments in Australia
2008 disestablishments in Australia
Far-right political parties in Australia